Aeromonas bivalvium is a Gram-negative, oxidase- and catalase-positive, motile bacterium with a polar flagellum of the genus Aeromonas isolated from bivalve molluscs.

References

External links
Type strain of Aeromonas bivalvium at BacDive -  the Bacterial Diversity Metadatabase

Aeromonadales
Bacteria described in 2007